Kaori Hamura Long is an artist and illustrator, has many TV and film credits, including MTV's Beavis and Butt-head, MTV Downtown, Daria and Celebrity Death Match, and Spike TV and Nickelodeon's Gary the Rat. She also created  MTV's Video Music Award  packaging animation and MTV2 Station I.D. She has done numerous magazine illustrations for New York Press, Time Out, Interview magazine, Mademoiselle, RayGun, COSMOgirl! and others. She has also done T-shirt designs for Anna Sui, Patricia Field, and Liquid Sky Records.

Hamura was born in Fukuoka, Japan, and graduated from Parsons School of Design in 1993. Her pilot animation, Bootie Boogie, was aired on Oxygen. Bootie Boogie has won a Silver Award for The Society of Illustrators' Annual Awards 2003 in Los Angeles. She established a creative company, Moss Moon Studio, with Bill Long. She has written and illustrated several children's books. She won the United Nations 75th Anniversary AR Peace Poster Competition in 2021.

Awards

 Winner of United Nations 75th Anniversary AR Peace Poster Competition, Futuring Peace, 2021
 A' Design Award Winner Print and Published Media Design, 2020
 A' Design Award Winner Mobile Technologies, Applications and Software Design Category, 2020
 Competition War on Virus, Emerald Award, 2020
 Silver Awards, The Illustration West 41 Annual Awards, The Society of Illustrators of Los Angeles, 2003

Work in films 

Captain Itch, Nickelodeon - Character Designer (2003)Gary the Rat, Spike TV - Character Designer (2001-2002)
Daria, MTV Animation  - Character Designer (2000-2001)
DownTown, MTV Animation  - Character designer (1999-2001)
 Bootie Boogie Oxygen Media  - Creator, Animator (2000)
Celebrity Deathmatch, MTV Animation  -Character Designer and Character Modeler (1996)
Beavis and Butt-Head Do America , MTV Animation - Senior Character Designer (1996) 
MTV Video Music Award Packaging Animation, MTV Animation  - Director, Character Designer, Animator (1995)
Beavis and Butt-Head,, MTV Animation - Character Designer (1993-1997)

References 
 
NPR
App Review
Goodreads Review
Brattleboro Museum & Art Center
Creators Station

External links
Official website
Moss Moon Studio
A' Design Award

Japanese illustrators
Japanese emigrants to the United States
Living people
Parsons School of Design alumni
People from Fukuoka
Year of birth missing (living people)